Robert Dunton Herman (1928 – April 9, 2021) was an American urban sociologist. He taught at Pomona College for four decades, and became known as an advocate for downtown Los Angeles.

Early life and education 
Herman was born in Champaign, Illinois, and raised in Hillsdale, Michigan. During his childhood, he lived in Tucson, Arizona, and Redlands, California. He earned a Bachelor of Arts degree in sociology from Pomona College in 1951 and a PhD in sociology from the University of Wisconsin–Madison.

Career 
Herman served as an electrical specialist in the United States Navy for two years. After earning his PhD, Herman taught at Iowa State University. He returned to Claremont, California, in 1960 and began teaching at Pomona College. He remained at the school for several decades and also served a chair of the Pomona College Sociology Department.

References

American sociologists
Urban sociologists
People from Claremont, California
Pomona College alumni
Pomona College faculty
1928 births
2021 deaths
University of Wisconsin–Madison alumni
Iowa State University faculty

Her

People from Champaign, Illinois
People from Hillsdale, Michigan